Antonio Haro (26 October 1910 – 22 September 2002) was a Mexican épée and sabre fencer. He competed at four Olympic Games.

References

External links
 

1910 births
2002 deaths
Mexican male épée fencers
Olympic fencers of Mexico
Fencers at the 1932 Summer Olympics
Fencers at the 1936 Summer Olympics
Fencers at the 1948 Summer Olympics
Fencers at the 1952 Summer Olympics
Fencers from Mexico City
Pan American Games medalists in fencing
Pan American Games gold medalists for Mexico
Fencers at the 1955 Pan American Games
Mexican male sabre fencers
20th-century Mexican people